Meir Wahl or Meir Wahl Katzenellenbogen, (also known as Meir Shauls and MAHARASH) was a Polish rabbi. He was the son of Saul Wahl, who according to legend, was king of Poland for one day. 

At the beginning of his rabbinical career, Wahl was the Av Beit Din at Tykocin, Poland, later moving on to the Av Beit Din position of Brest, Belarus. Saul was integral in the formation of the Council of the Land of Lithuania in 1623, the controlling legal body for the Jews of Lithuania.

Wahl had a daughter named Baila who married Rabbi Yonah Teomim, who were parents to prominent rabbis.

References

Rabbis from Brest, Belarus
17th-century Polish rabbis
Date of birth unknown
Date of death unknown